St Peter's College, Saltley was a school and teacher training establishment located in Saltley, Birmingham, England. Today the former college building has now been refurbished and sub-divided into a multi-use facility, combining homes, offices and meeting rooms.

History
Founded in 1852 in part with help from MP Charles Adderley (later Baron Norton) as modern Saltley developed, it opened as Worcester, Lichfield & Hereford Diocesan Training College and then Saltley Church of England College for teacher training. Designed by Gothic Revival architect Benjamin Ferrey, it was built in a Tudor Revival architecture style format of a University of Oxford college, created around a quadrangle at the top of College Road. It housed only 30 trainee teachers initially, which quickly rose to 300 students.

The college had its own school, known initially as the Worcester Diocesan Practising School, it followed the college in naming and changed to St Peter's School. Located on the junction of College Road and Bridge Road, on opening in 1853 it had two classrooms, one master and 185 boys. A new school room allowed pupil numbers to rise to nearly 500 by 1871. Hit by a Luftwaffe bomb during World War II, the school closed in 1941 and never reopened.

The college reopened after World War II, and latterly known as St Peter's, it expanded quickly in the mid-1960s to cope with falling teacher numbers and rising school rolls, with the first female students admitted in 1966. The college closed in 1978. The Old Salts' Association (OSA) has an annual reunion on the first Saturday in July at College. The OSA also has a 'closed group' Facebook page. This Facebook page now (2017) has over 230 members, who actively share old photos, anecdotes and stories from their days within the College walls. Another Facebook page, 'Saltley College 1964' also shares memories from men who attended the college from 1961 ~ 1964.

Redevelopment
The Church of England owned building was sold to the local authority in 1980, and then used as a hall of residence by Aston University. The funds from the sale of the buildings were used to create the St Peter's Saltley Trust  in 1980. The trust has three objectives in its work across the West Midlands of England: lay Christian education; further education; and religious education in schools. The trust generally makes funds available to enable projects which meet its objectives to take place.

After the university vacated the building, it was redeveloped by the authority as homes, community centre and as local authority offices.

Saltley College Football Club

The college also had a football team made up of its students, which was one of the earliest clubs in the Midlands.

History

The earliest reported match for the club - a one goal to nil victory over a club named Incogniti on 15 February 1873 - may have been the first game in Birmingham to the association football laws.  A return match played at Adderley Park saw the College win by 5 goals to nil.  The laws which applied are not made clear; the lack of references to touchdowns in either match suggests they were not rugby matches.  At the time, the Sheffield rules were popular in the north of England, and the Calthorpe F.C. club, formed at around this time, was promoting the association laws.

The club was a founder member of the Birmingham Football Association and played in the first Birmingham Senior Cup in 1876–77, contributing £1 12s to the cost of the trophy.

The club captain for 1876, William Thompson, introduced a passing game to the side in place of the dribbling game hitherto played, helping the club to the semi-final of the competition in its first three seasons, beating Aston Villa in 1877–78 en route to losing to Wednesbury Strollers F.C. in front of a crowd of 2,000 at Villa's Wellington Road ground. The Collegians went further in 1879–80, reaching the final, beating Stoke in the third round, in a tie delayed to allow the students to return to college after a mid-term break.  In the semi-final round the club lost 3–0 to Derby F.C. at the Aston Lower Grounds, but a protest was made that one of the Derby players was "cup-tied", having already played for the Wednesbury Strollers in the Sheffield Challenge Cup, against the rules of the competition which barred any player from representing more than one side in competitive matches.  The protest was upheld and the College put into the final, where it lost 3–1 to Villa.

The match was the College's high point in football.  It never entered the FA Cup and the next time it reached the quarter-finals of the Senior Cup, in 1881–82, it was beaten 6–0 at Wednesbury Old Athletic F.C.; the club's final match in the competition came the next season, a 9–0 defeat at Walsall Swifts F.C. in the third round.  The Saltley College side continued playing in amateur football until 1967.

Colours

The club listed its colours as blue.  The club later added yellow trim and red stockings.

Ground

The club's pitch in the college grounds was, like the Muntz Street ground of Small Heath Alliance, notorious for being "indented with furrows, which caused an approaching line of forwards to bear resemblance to a thinly-tenanted switchback-car".  Partly as a result the club was unbeaten at home until losing to Wednesbury Old Athletic F.C. in October 1878, by the remarkalbe score of 10–3, "much to the surprise of [the club] and the other collegians who witnessed the match".

Notable players

The College was considered a nursery of footballing talent, relying strictly on "science" and avoiding charging, with players such as Thomas Slaney of Stoke City F.C., John Brodie, George Copley, Tom Bryan (later of Wednesbury Strollers and Aston Villa), and champion sprinter Charles Johnstone all went through the College.

The most famous college player however was Teddy Johnson, who earned a cap for England in 1880, while captain of the College.

The College also provided players to the Birmingham FA representative side, such as Rutherford and Goodyear, who played in the matches against the London Football Association in 1878, and Johnson represented the Birmingham FA in the "junior international" against Scotland in 1880.

References

External links
Saltley Trust

Grade II listed buildings in Birmingham
Defunct schools in Birmingham, West Midlands
Tudor Revival architecture in England
Educational institutions established in 1852
1852 establishments in England
Educational institutions disestablished in 1978
1978 disestablishments in England
Defunct football clubs in Warwickshire
Defunct football clubs in the West Midlands (county)
Football clubs in Birmingham, West Midlands